Campbell Patrick White (November 30, 1787 – February 12, 1859) was an American businessman and politician who served four terms as a U.S. Representative from New York from 1829 to 1835.

Biography
Born in Ireland, White received a limited education.  He immigrated to the United States in 1816 and engaged in mercantile pursuits in New York City.

Congress 
White was elected as a Jacksonian to the Twenty-first and to the three succeeding Congresses and served from March 4, 1829, to October 2, 1835, when he resigned before the 24th United States Congress met.
He served as chairman of the Committee on Naval Affairs (Twenty-third Congress).

Later career and death 
White resumed mercantile pursuits.  He was appointed quartermaster general of the State militia on January 24, 1831.  He served as delegate to the New York State constitutional convention in 1845.  He resided in New York City until his death on February 12, 1859.  He was interred in St. Paul's Cemetery.

References 

1787 births
1859 deaths
Irish emigrants to the United States (before 1923)
Jacksonian members of the United States House of Representatives from New York (state)
19th-century American politicians
Burials at St. Paul's Chapel
Members of the United States House of Representatives from New York (state)